is a former Japanese football player. He played for Japan national team.

Club career
Ozawa was born in Utsunomiya on December 25, 1932. After graduating from Tokyo University of Education, he joined Toyo Industries in 1955. In 1962, he was selected Japanese Footballer of the Year awards. In 1965, Toyo Industries joined new league Japan Soccer League. He retired in 1967. He played 42 games and the club also won the championship for 3 years in a row (1965-1967) in the league.

National team career
In June 1956, he was selected Japan national team for 1956 Summer Olympics qualification. At this qualification, on June 3, he debuted against South Korea. In November, he played at 1956 Summer Olympics in Melbourne. He also played at 1958 and 1962 Asian Games. In 1964, when he was 31 years old, he was the captain of Japan national team, but he was not selected as a member for 1964 Summer Olympics in Tokyo for generational change. He played 36 games for Japan until 1964.

In 2014, Ozawa was selected Japan Football Hall of Fame.

National team statistics

References

External links
 
 Japan National Football Team Database
Japan Football Hall of Fame at Japan Football Association

1932 births
Living people
University of Tsukuba alumni
Association football people from Tochigi Prefecture
Japanese footballers
Japan international footballers
Japan Soccer League players
Sanfrecce Hiroshima players
Olympic footballers of Japan
Footballers at the 1956 Summer Olympics
Footballers at the 1958 Asian Games
Footballers at the 1962 Asian Games
Association football midfielders
Asian Games competitors for Japan